P27 may refer to:

 CDKN1B, cyclin-dependent kinase inhibitor 1B
 ČZ vz. 27, a pistol
 IFI27, interferon alpha-inducible protein 27
 Papyrus 27, a biblical manuscript
 Phosphorus-27, an isotope of phosphorus
 Pixley Airport, in Tulare County, California, United States
 Projekt-27, an intelligence-gathering unit of the Swiss Armed Forces